Hold On 'til the Night is the debut studio album by American singer Greyson Chance. The album was released on August 2, 2011 by eleveneleven, Maverick Records, Streamline Records, and Geffen Records. Chance's album is the first to be released on Ellen DeGeneres' record label eleveneleven. The album's release was preceded by two singles, "Waiting Outside the Lines" and "Unfriend You". The album was recorded in Los Angeles and produced by The Matrix, Billy Steinberg and Ron Fair.

Singles
"Waiting Outside the Lines" was released as the first single on October 26, 2010 and as an EP release on April 19, 2011. The music video, directed by Sanaa Hamri, was released December 13, 2010.

"Unfriend You" was released as the second single on May 17, 2011. The music video, which features Ariana Grande, was released on June 30, 2011.

"Hold On 'til the Night", the title track, is the third single from the album. A music video for the song was shot on November 6, 2011. The music video premiered on Friday, December 9 on VEVO.

"Take a Look at Me Now" was released in Asia on February 5, 2012 as the fourth single from the album.

Critical reception

Chance's debut album has received mixed to positive reviews. Us Magazine rewarded Chance with three stars and a positive review, claiming that he "outdoes himself with 10 originals". Entertainment Weekly gave Chance a positive review as well by complimenting his mature voice saying, "Chance reveals a surprisingly mature voice on 'Hold On 'Til the Night' ('Heart Like Stone' provides a welcome touch of outsider brooding), though the Facebook-spurred melodrama of 'Unfriend You' reminds listeners that he is, after all, just a kid." The overall grade for the album was a B. John Terauds of the Toronto Star gave it three-and-a-half stars, writing that "the boy's debut 10-track album is a solid effort that owes a massive debt to the boy bands of the 1990s" and ended with, "This YouTube phenom is standing on solid artistic ground here."

Rolling Stone gave the album a two star review, stating that "the 13-year-old is anything but threatening on this potential blockbuster of a debut", however the Rolling Stone community gave the album four and a half stars. NY Daily News also gave the album two stars explaining that "the singer's androgynous pitch — which lies well north of Justin Bieber's — limits his ability to make the CD's love songs credible for anyone over his own age".

Metacritic gave the album a 58 out of 100 based on 4 reviews, indicating "mixed to average reviews".

Commercial performance
In the US, the album sold 16,185 copies in its first week, debuting at number 29 on the Billboard 200. In Canada, the album debuted at number 67 on the Canadian Albums Chart. The album re-entered the Billboard 200 chart on September 22, 2011 at number 144.

Track listing

Charts

References

External links
 

2011 debut albums
Greyson Chance albums
Albums produced by Billy Steinberg
Albums produced by Da Internz
Albums produced by Matt Squire
Albums produced by the Matrix (production team)
Eleveneleven albums
Geffen Records albums
Maverick Records albums